The Karyes Typikon was written for the Karyes cell on Mount Athos in 1199 by Saint Sava, at the time a monk and later the first Serbian Archbishop. It is basically a translation from a standard Greek ascetic typikon with some minor changes. It became a model for Serbian solitary or eremitical monasticism also outside of Mount Athos. It is published along with the Catalog of Cyrillic manuscripts from the Hilandar monastery since 1908.

See also
Studenica Typikon
Charter of Hilandar
Serbian manuscripts

References

Sources

12th-century Christian texts
Medieval documents of Serbia
Serbian literature
Serbian books
Serbian manuscripts
Saint Sava
1190s works
History of the Serbian Orthodox Church
Mount Athos
Cyrillic manuscripts
Athos manuscripts